Asger Christensen (born 8 January 1958) is a Danish politician who was elected as a Member of the European Parliament in 2019.

Early career
Christensen has owned a farm since 1982 and he is a farmer. He is from Tarm.

Political career
In parliament, Christensen is part of the parliamentary group Renew Europe since his national party affiliation is with Venstre. He serves on the Committee on Agriculture and Rural Development. In 2020, he also joined the Committee of Inquiry on the Protection of Animals during Transport.

In addition to his committee assignments, Christensen is part of the parliament's delegation for relations with China. He is also a member of the European Parliament Intergroup on LGBT Rights.

References

External links
 Official website: https://asger.nu/

Living people
MEPs for Denmark 2019–2024
1958 births
21st-century Danish politicians
Venstre (Denmark) politicians
People from Ringkøbing-Skjern Municipality